Ada-George Road also known as Ada-George is a town in Rivers State, Port Harcourt,  Nigeria.

History 
The name Ada-George Road was originated from the second governor of river state, Rufus Ada George.

Geography 
Ada-George Road is consist of two express way left & right linking to Location Bus stop which has an unfinished project flyover constructed by Julius Berger and Agip Bus stop.

References 

Towns in Rivers State
Obio-Akpor
Geography of Port Harcourt